Wadrilltal is a quarter (Stadtteil) of the town Wadern, in Merzig-Wadern district, Saarland, in the south-west of Germany. It is situated on the small river Wadrill. Wadrilltal is known for its large forests and for its hiking trails.

References

External links
 Stadt Wadern

Villages in Saarland
Merzig-Wadern